The 9th Houston Film Critics Society Awards nominations were announced on December 13, 2015. The 2015 awards were given out at a ceremony held at Sundance Cinemas Houston on January 9, 2016. The awards are presented annually by the Houston Film Critics Society based in Houston, Texas.

Winners and nominees 
Winners are listed first and highlighted with boldface.

Movies with multiple nominations and awards

The following films received multiple nominations:

The following films received multiple awards:

References

External links 
 Houston Film Critics Society: Awards

2015
2015 film awards
2015 in Texas
Houston